Ralph of Lechlade was the Dean of Wells during 1217.

References

Deans of Wells